Abouba Sibomana (born 24 January 1989) is a Rwandan footballer who currently plays for Gor Mahia FC in the Kenyan Premier League as a defender.

References

Living people
1989 births
Rwandan footballers
Rwanda international footballers
Rwandan expatriate footballers
Expatriate footballers in Kenya
Association football defenders
Rayon Sports F.C. players
Gor Mahia F.C. players
Kenyan Premier League players
Rwandan expatriate sportspeople in Kenya
People from Butare
Rwanda A' international footballers
2011 African Nations Championship players